Lisa Raymond and Rennae Stubbs were the defending champions, but none competed this year. Raymond entered the tournament, but decided to focus on the singles competition.

Corina Morariu and Kimberly Po won the title by defeating Tamarine Tanasugarn and Elena Tatarkova 6–4, 4–6, 6–2 in the final.

Seeds

Draw

Draw

References
 Official results archive (ITF)
 Official results archive (WTA)

2000 WTA Tour